Segre may refer to:

 Segre (surname)
 Sègre (department), a former department of France
 Segre River, a river in Catalonia
 Segré, a commune in Maine-et-Loire, France
 Segré, Burkina Faso
 Diari Segre or Segre, a Spanish- and Catalan-language daily newspaper

See also
Segre classification
Segre embedding